Karaduman is a Turkish surname. Notable people with the surname include:

Burak Karaduman (born 1985), Turkish footballer
Emrah Karaduman (born 1992), Turkish composer and arranger
Mahmut Karaduman, Turkish national and the plaintiff in a famous libel case

Turkish-language surnames